FabricLive.33 is a DJ mix compilation album by Spank Rock, as part of the FabricLive Mix Series.

Track listing
  Intro
  Kurtis Blow – The Breaks – Universal
  CSS – Let's Make Love and Listen to Death from Above (Spank Rock Remix) – Sub Pop
  Mr Oizo – Nazis (Justice Mix) – F Communications
  Dominatrix – The Dominatrix Sleeps Tonight – Stuart Argabright
  Yello – Bostich – Universal
  Zongamin – Bongo Song – XL
  Kano – I'm Ready – Antibemusic
  Daft Punk – Technologic – Virgin
  Switch – A Bit Patchy – Data
  The Contours – Do You Love Me – Motown
  Mylo – Drop the Pressure – Breastfed
  Yes – Owner of a Lonely Heart – Rhino
  Para One – Dudun Dun – Institubes
  Best Fwends – Myself (Xxxchange Remix) – Moshi Moshi
  KW Griff – Good Man – Morphius
  Uffie – Hot Chick (Feadz Edit) – Ed Banger
  Metro Area – Orange Alert (DFA Remix) – Source
  Tangerine Dream – Love on a Real Train – Virgin
  Simian Mobile Disco – Hustler – Wichita
  The Romantics – Talking in Your Sleep – Nemperor Records
  Chicks on Speed - Wordy Rappinghood (The Playgroup Remix) - Chicks on Speed Records
  Bonde do Rolê – Melô Do Tabacco (XXXChange Remix with The Ford Granada) – Mad Decent
  Miss Kittin and The Hacker – Stock Exchange – Miss Kittin
  Rick Ross – Hustlin' – Island Def Jam
  Hot Chip – Over and Over (Maurice Fulton Remix) – EMI
  Gaz Nevada – I.C. Love Affair – Expanded Music
  L.T.D. – Love to the World – A&M
  Outro

References

External links
Fabric: FabricLive.33

Fabric (club) albums
Spank Rock albums
2007 compilation albums